George Spencer may refer to:
George Spencer (c. 1600–1642), first white man to be executed in Connecticut, see Execution of George Spencer
George Spencer, 4th Duke of Marlborough (1739–1817), British courtier and politician
George Spencer, 2nd Earl Spencer (1758–1834), British Whig politician
Ignatius Spencer (1799–1864), son of 2nd Earl Spencer, known as George Spencer before entering the Passionist congregation
George Spencer (bishop) (1799–1866), Anglican bishop
George E. Spencer (1836–1893), U.S. senator from the state of Alabama
George Spencer (Labour politician) (1872–1957), Member of Parliament for Broxtowe, 1918–1929
G. Lloyd Spencer (1893–1981), Democratic United States Senator from the State of Arkansas
George Spencer (baseball) (1926–2014), American baseball pitcher
George Spencer (rugby) (1878–1950), New Zealand rugby football player

See also
George Spencer Academy, an academy school in Stapleford, Nottinghamshire, England
George Spencer-Churchill (disambiguation)